Nick Foster is a British composer and music producer based in London. He is best-known for his work as a composer for television, commercials and film.

Career
Foster’s recent work includes Jack Whitehall & Freddy Syborn’s comedy-drama for Sky One, Bounty Hunters, along with Daniel Lawrence Taylor's comedy Timewasters  (ITV2) and ITV’s animated family adventure series, co-produced with Weta, Thunderbirds Are Go (written with his brother Ben Foster), now in its fourth year, and for which they were nominated for a Bafta in 2016.

He has scored all of Derren Brown’s recent TV specials. His music also features in the Ryan Gosling / Michelle Williams film Blue Valentine, and in Raoul Martinez and Joshua Van Praag's Creating Freedom: Lottery of Birth, nominated for Best Documentary at Raindance Film Festival. He has composed the music for Channel 4's charity initiative Stand Up To Cancer.

He also works as a composer of music for commercials; in this field his work has won numerous awards for original composition including D&AD, Clio, Craft and MAS. He has worked with directors including Jonathan Glazer, Joachim Back, Wim Wenders and Nick Gordon. Recent work includes "When You Love Something" for the BBC, directed by Vaughan Arnell, Steve Ayson's Grey Goose "La Pursuit", Specsavers "Boiler", directed by Danny Kleinman, and Apple's "Your Verse" campaign with Esa-Pekka Salonen.

Other TV work includes scores for entertainment shows including The Cube, Bigheads and Penn & Teller: Fool Us.

He has also been involved in various music education initiatives, most recently Bafta Kids’ Big School Day, held at Alexandra Palace.

Silva Screen Records has to date released two volumes of Nick & Ben Foster's score for Thunderbirds Are Go, performed by the City of Prague Symphony Orchestra.

Classically trained, Foster began his career in music as a record producer, writing songs and making records with Gary Barlow, S Club 7, East 17 and Kylie Minogue.

Awards
British Animation Award 2018 - Thunderbirds Are Go - nominated (with Ben Foster / Hackenbacker / Peacock Sound) 
BAFTA Craft Award 2016 - Best Music - Thunderbirds Are Go - nominated (with Ben Foster)
MAS Award 2017 - Best Original Music for Television - Thunderbirds Are Go - nominated (with Ben Foster)
Kinsale Sharks 2017 - Best Original Music for Commercial - Visa 'The Heart'
BAFTA Craft Award 2013 - Derren Brown - Apocalypse
BAFTA Craft Award 2012 - Derren Brown - The Secret of Luck - nominated
BAFTA Craft Award 2011 – The Cube
Gold Clio Best Original Music 2008 – Sony Walkman 'Music Pieces'
D&AD winner Yellow Pencil Best Use Of Music 2008 – Sony Walkman 'Music Pieces'
BTAA Awards 2008 : Best 60–90 Second TV Commercial (Gold) – Sony Walkman 'Music Pieces'
BTA Craft Awards : Best Original Music 2007 – Ford “Own the Road Again”
D&AD winner Yellow Pencil Best Use of Music 2006 – 3 Mobile "Tuperzik"

Notable work

Television
Thunderbirds Are Go - ITV 1 and CITV 2015–present (with Ben Foster)
Derren Brown - The Push - Channel 4 / Netflix 2018
Bounty Hunters - Cave Bear / Sky One 2017–present (with Ben Foster)
Timewasters - Big Talk / ITV2 2017–present (with Oli Julian)
Penn & Teller : Fool Us – The CW 2015–present
Hospital People - BBC One 2017 (with Oli Julian)
Bigheads - ITV / Primal Media 2017
Hank Zipzer's Christmas Catastrophe - CBBC 2016
Derren Brown - Twisted Tales - Vaudeville / Channel Four 2016
The Code - BBC One 2016
Hank Zipzer - Kindle / BBC 2013-16
Stand Up To Cancer - Channel Four 2014
Puppy Love - BBC Four 2014
BBC Commonwealth Games 2014 (with Peter Raeburn)
Bad Robots - Objective / E4 2014 
Crowd Rules - CNBC 2016
The Great Art Robbery - Channel Four 2013
The Cube - Objective /  ITV 2009-15
The Job - Embassy Row / CBS 2013
Derren Brown - Apocalypse - Objective / Channel Four 2012 (with Ben Foster)
Beauty & The Beast - Betty / Channel Four 2012
ITV1 on-screen identities 2006–14 (with Peter Raeburn)
Derren Brown - Placebo / The Experiments / Miracles For Sale - Objective / Channel Four
Hero at 30,000 Feet - Objective / Channel Four
Rocket's Island - Lime Pictures / CBBC (with Oli Julian)
The Exit List – Gogglebox / ITV 2012
The Channel 4 Mash Up – Fresh One / Channel Four 2011

Film
Blue Valentine – "At The Drop of The Day" (composition with Matt Sweeney & Peter Raeburn) - 2011 dir. Derek Cianfrance
Creating Freedom: Lottery of Birth (additional music) - 2013 dir. Raoul Martinez / Joshua Van Praag
Molly Moon and the Incredible Book of Hypnotism (additional music) - 2015 dir. Christopher N. Rowley

References

External links
Discography
 

English male composers
English record producers
English songwriters
English television composers
Year of birth missing (living people)
Living people